The Yerrapalli Formation is a Triassic rock formation consisting primarily of mudstones that outcrops in the Pranhita–Godavari Basin in southeastern India. The Yerrapalli Formation preserves fossils of freshwater and terrestrial vertebrates as well as trace fossils of invertebrates. The tetrapod fauna includes temnospondyl amphibians, archosauromorph reptiles, and dicynodonts.

Geology 
Most of the Yerrapalli Formation consists of red mudstones. The mudstones were deposited across a floodplain during the Anisian stage of the Middle Triassic. Smaller lenses of calcareous sandstone represent ephemeral streams that branched off from the larger channels that were the source of the floodplain sediments. The climate of the region during the time is thought to have been monsoonal with both wet and dry seasons.

The Yerrapalli Formation overlies the Kamthi Formation, underlies the Bhimaram Formation, and is conformable with both formations. Two members of the Yerrapalli Formation have been recognized; a lower member consisting of layers of red and purple clay with lenses of pale green clay and an upper member consisting of alternating layers of clay and fine-grained sandstone.

Paleobiota 
The paleobiota of the Yerrapalli Formation is similar to that of the overlying Maleri Formation, which also preserves fossils of temnospondyls and archosauromorphs. The main difference between the Yerrapalli and the Maleri faunae is the presence of dicynodonts in the former. The discovery of dicynodont fossils in the Pranhita-Godavari Basin in 1964 was one of the earliest indications that the Yerrapalli Formation represented a distinct paleofauna. Before this discovery, Yerrapalli strata were grouped within the Maleri Formation. The dicynodonts of the Yerrapalli Formation are similar to those of the Ntawere Formation in Zambia, which also dates back to the Anisian. During the Middle Triassic, what is now India and southern Africa formed one continuous landmass as part of the supercontinent Gondwana.

Synapsids

Reptiles

Amphibians

Fish

See also 
 Donguz Formation, contemporaneous fossiliferous formation of Russia
 Ermaying Formation, contemporaneous fossiliferous formation of China
 Manda Formation, contemporaneous fossiliferous formation of Tanzania
 Ntawere Formation, contemporaneous fossiliferous formation of Zambia
 Omingonde Formation, contemporaneous fossiliferous formation of Namibia

References 

Geologic formations of India
Triassic System of Asia
Triassic India
Anisian Stage
Mudstone formations
Fluvial deposits
Paleontology in India
Geology of Andhra Pradesh
Formations